Kevin Mitchell (born 28 February 1945) is  a former Australian rules footballer who played with Fitzroy in the Victorian Football League (VFL).

Notes

External links 		
		
		
		
		
		
		
Living people		
1945 births		
		
Australian rules footballers from Victoria (Australia)		
Fitzroy Football Club players